The 1956 Gael Linn Cup is a representative competition for elite level participants in the women's team field sport of camogie, was won by Leinster, who defeated Ulster in the final, played at Knockbridge.

Prelude
The idea of an inter-provincial tournament had been discussed for a decade before 1956 but was slow to be brought to fruition. This was inspired by the memory of successful interprovincial camogie matches which were played as part of the 1928 and 1932 Tailteann Games programmes. The GAA's railway cup tournaments were then at the height of their popularity, attracting a record attendance of 49,023 to their St Patrick's Day finals double fixture of 1954 and 52,619.to the hrulign final of 1955. It was chosen to play ain inter-provincial match on 19 September 1954 in Navan as part of the 50th anniversary celebrations of the Camogie Association, as a tribute to Navan's rople in hosting the very first camogie match in July 1954. Munster beat Ulster by 8–3 to 5–3 in a match that was described as the best of the year. Con Keneally wrote in the Irish Independent
In no way perturbed by the heavy rain that fell for most of the game the two teams gave an admirable display. Kathleen Mills and Una O'Connor had first class games. Una O'Connor was particularly prominent at the end as was the full forward Kay Douglas who had to work very hard before she got the better of the Ulster full back Moya Forde.
It still took two years for the new inter-provincial tournament to reach fruition. Notwithstanding the role of the rival Conradh na Gaeilge in the foundation and early history of camogie, Irish language organisation Gael Linn donated a trophy for inter-provincial competition, which was handed by Gael Linn trustee Máire Breathnach to Sile Nic an Ultaigh at a ceremony in Dublin on 11 November 1956 Donal Ó Moráin said Gael Linn were delighted to show special appreciation of the Camogie Association because It is one of those national bodies which has done so much for the Irish sport. I hope the Gael Linn competition will encourage more colleges to give preference to caogie in their sporting activities.

The Final
Leinster defeated Munster, 6–4 to 4–2 at Cahir. Ulster got a bye to the final as Connacht did not enter a team. Leinster then defeated Ulster, 7–1 to 3–1, in the final at Knockbridge, County Louth with Dublin forward, Una O'Connor scoring five goals.
 Agnes Hourigan wrote in the Irish Press: The Leinster captain Annette Corrigan was brilliant throughout and gave her side great inspiration as she controlled the midfield. Una O'Connor laid the foundation of the Leinster victory with her three first half goals, but there was no better forward than Kay Mills.

Final stages

|}

Exhibition match in Navan 19 September 1954 Munster 8–3 Ulster 5–3

|}

References

External links
 Camogie Association

1956 in camogie
1956
1956 in Northern Ireland sport